Ricky is a male given name in English and Spanish-speaking countries, often a diminutive form (hypocorism) of Richard, Frederick, Derrick, Roderick, Enrique, Patrick, Ricardo or  Eric.

Persons
Ricky (musician), Japanese singer and musician 
Ricky Allen (1935–2005), American blues singer
Ricky Anderson (American football) (born 1963), American football player
Ricky Anggawijaya (born 1996), Indonesian swimmer
Ricky Banderas (born 1975), Puerto Rican wrestler
Ricky Barham (born 1958), Australian rules football player
Ricky Bartlett (born 1972), American radio (KMRY/CBS) and actor 
Ricky Bell (disambiguation), multiple people
Ricky Blitt, American screenwriter, producer, show creator and voice actor 
Ricky Bruch (1946–2011), Swedish discus thrower and Olympian athlete, actor
Ricky Carmichael (born 1979), American car racer 
Ricky Churchman (born 1958), American football player
Ricky Davao (born 1961), Filipino actor and director
Ricky Davis (born 1979), American NBA basketball player 
Ricky Fataar (born 1952), South African musician, multi-instrumentalist 
Ricky Gervais (born 1961), English comedian, actor, writer, producer, director, singer, and musician
Ricky Groves (born 1968), English actor
Ricky Harun (born 1987), Indonesian actor
Ricky Hatton (born 1978), English professional boxer, promoter 
Ricky Hendrick (1980–2004), American NASCAR stock car driver
Ricky Hill (born 1959), English former football player, manager and head coach
Ricky Hui (1946–2011), Hong Kong film actor
Ricky Kim (born 1981), American model and actor
Ricky Lumpkin (born 1988), American football player
Ricky Martin (born 1971), Puerto Rican pop musician, actor
Ricky Meléndez (born 1967), Puerto Rican singer
Ricky Nelson (1940–1985), American actor, musician and singer-songwriter
Ricky Owubokiri (born 1961), Nigerian footballer
Ricky Pierce (born 1959), American NBA basketball player
Ricky Reyes (born 1978), Mexican–Puerto Rican wrestler 
Ricky Rickard (born 1958), New Zealand wrestler
Ricky Rubio (born 1990), Spanish / NBA basketball player
Ricky Van Shelton (born 1952), American country music singer
Ricky Stenhouse Jr. (born 1987), American NASCAR stock car driver
Ricky Tognazzi (born 1955), Italian film actor and director
Ricky Ullman (born 1986), Israeli-American actor and musician
Ricky Valance (1936–2020), Welsh singer 
Ricky Walker (born 1996), American football player
Ricky Wilde (born 1961), British songwriter, musician, record producer
Ricky Wilson (American musician) (1953–1985), American instrumentalist and singer-songwriter 
Ricky Wilson (British musician) (born 1978), lead singer of English band Kaiser Chiefs
Ricky Yang, Indonesian pool player

Fictional characters
 Ricky in Riki-Oh or The Story of Ricky, a manga, an anime series and a live-action film
 Ricky in Ricky, a 2009 fantasy film
 Ricky Baker, portrayed by Morris Chestnut in the 1991 film, Boyz n the Hood
 Ricky Bobby, protagonist in Talladega Nights: The Ballad of Ricky Bobby
 Richard "Ricky" Chapman/Caldwell, minor protagonist and later antagonist of the Silent Night, Deadly Night series
 Ricky King in Honey, We Shrunk Ourselves
 Ricky LaFleur (Trailer Park Boys character)
 Ricky Lang, a character in the 1983 superhero movie Superman III
 Ricky Ricardo, male protagonist in the TV series I Love Lucy
 Ricky Ricotta, protagonist in the book series Ricky Ricotta's Mighty Robot
 Ricky Rapper, protagonist in Finnish books and comic strips series
 Richard Bluedhorn "Rick" or "Ricky" Stratton, the main character in the American TV sitcom Silver Spoons
 Ricky Taylor, a character in the  2008 British slasher movie Eden Lake
 Ricky "Zigzag" in the novel Holes and its film adaptation

See also
 Ricky (disambiguation)
 Rickey (disambiguation)
 Rickie
 Riki (given name)

English masculine given names
Masculine given names
Hypocorisms